The 1992 San Diego Padres season was the 24th season in franchise history. It saw the team finish in third place in the National League West with a record of 82 wins and 80 losses. They also hosted the 1992 Major League Baseball All-Star Game.

Offseason
 November 20, 1991: Derek Lilliquist was selected off waivers from the Padres by the Cleveland Indians.
 December 8, 1991: Bip Roberts and a player to be named later were traded by the Padres to the Cincinnati Reds for Randy Myers. The Padres completed the trade by sending Craig Pueschner (minors) to the Reds on December 9.
 December 11, 1991: Steve Rosenberg was traded by the Padres to the New York Mets for Jeff Gardner.
 January 8, 1992: Tim Teufel was signed as a free agent by the Padres.
 March 26, 1992: Ricky Bones, José Valentín, and Matt Mieske were traded by the Padres to the Milwaukee Brewers for Gary Sheffield and Geoff Kellogg (minors).

Regular season

All-Star game
The 1992 Major League Baseball All-Star Game was the 63rd playing of the midsummer classic between the all-stars of the American League (AL) and National League (NL). The game was held on July 14, 1992, at Jack Murphy Stadium in San Diego. The game resulted in the American League defeating the National League 13-6.

Opening Day starters

Season standings

Record vs. opponents

Notable transactions
 June 1, 1992: Todd Helton was drafted by the Padres in the 2nd round of the 1992 Major League Baseball draft, but did not sign.
 July 6, 1992: Scott Coolbaugh was traded by the Padres to the Cincinnati Reds for Lenny Wentz (minors).

Roster

Player stats

Batting

Starters by position
Note: Pos = Position; G = Games played; AB = At bats; H = Hits; Avg. = Batting average; HR = Home runs; RBI = Runs batted in

Other batters
Note: G = Games played; AB = At bats; H = Hits; Avg. = Batting average; HR = Home runs; RBI = Runs batted in

Pitching

Starting pitchers
Note: G = Games pitched; CG = Complete games; IP = Innings pitched; W = Wins; L = Losses; ERA = Earned run average; SO = Strikeouts

Relief pitchers
Note: G = Games pitched; W = Wins; L = Losses; SV = Saves; ERA = Earned run average; SO = Strikeouts

Award winners
 Fred McGriff, National League Home Run Champion (35)
 Gary Sheffield, National League Batting Champion, .330
1992 Major League Baseball All-Star Game

Farm system

LEAGUE CHAMPIONS: Wichita

References

External links
 1992 San Diego Padres at Baseball Reference
 1992 San Diego Padres at Baseball Almanac

San Diego Padres seasons
San Diego Padres season
San Diego Padres